Nasir Wasti (September 6, 1967 – July 21, 2006) was a Pakistani first-class cricketer who played for Pakistan National Shipping Corporation (PNSC). He captained the club during his last two seasons.

Wasti died in 2006 when his car crashed into a trailer on the Super Highway in Karachi.

References

External links
 

1967 births
2006 deaths
Pakistani cricketers
Pakistan National Shipping Corporation cricketers
Road incident deaths in Pakistan
Cricketers from Karachi